The 1909 Penn Quakers football team represented the University of Pennsylvania in the 1909 college football season. The Quakers finished with a 7–1–2 record in their first year under head coach and College Football Hall of Fame inductee, Andy Smith. Their only loss was to Michigan by a 12 to 6 score, a game that snapped Penn's 23-game winning streak and marked the first time a Western team had defeated one of the "Big Four" (Harvard, Yale, Princeton and Penn). Other significant games included a 12 to 0 victory over West Virginia, a 3-3 tie with Penn State, a 29 to 6 victory over Carlisle, and a 17 to 6 victory over Cornell.  They outscored their opponents by a combined total of 146 to 38.  End Harry Braddock was the only Penn player to receive All-America honors in 1909, receiving second-team honors from Walter Camp.

Schedule

References

Penn
Penn Quakers football seasons
Penn Quakers football